The Baropasi or Barapasi language is a member of the East Geelvink Bay languages. It is spoken in Upper Waropen District, Mamberamo Raya Regency, Papua, Indonesia. It has about 1,000 speakers.

Phonology
Barapasi is tonal, with a high tone and low tone.

Sources
 Moseley, Christopher and R. E. Asher, ed. Atlas of the World's Languages (New York: Routelage, 1994) p. 111

References

Languages of western New Guinea
East Geelvink Bay languages
Tonal languages in non-tonal families